The 1968 All-Big Ten Conference football team consists of American football players chosen by various organizations for All-Big Ten Conference teams for the 1968 Big Ten Conference football season.

Offensive selections

Quarterbacks
 Dennis Brown, Michigan (AP-1; UPI-1)
 Harry Gonso, Indiana (AP-2; UPI-2)

Running backs
 Ron Johnson, Michigan (AP-1; UPI-1)
 Leroy Keyes, Purdue (AP-1; UPI-1)
 Ed Podolak, Iowa (AP-1; UPI-2)
 Perry Williams, Purdue (UPI-1)
 Rich Johnson, Illinois (AP-2; UPI-2)
 Rex Kern, Ohio State (AP-2)
 Jim Otis, Ohio State (AP-2)
 John Isenbarger, Indiana (UPI-2)

Ends
 Jade Butcher, Indiana (AP-1; UPI-1)
 Jim Mandich, Michigan (AP-1; UPI-1)
 Bruce Jankowski, Ohio State (AP-2)
 Ray Parson, Minnesota (AP-2)
 Al Bream, Iowa (UPI-2)

Tackles
 Rufus Mayes, Ohio State (AP-1; UPI-1)
 Dave Foley, Ohio State (AP-1; UPI-1)
 Clanton King, Purdue (AP-2; UPI-2)
 Dan Dierdorf, Michigan (AP-2)
 Ezell Jones, Minnesota (UPI-2)

Guards
 Gary Roberts, Purdue (AP-1; UPI-1)
 Jon Meskimen, Iowa (AP-1; UPI-2)
 Dick Enderle, Minnesota (UPI-1)
 Stan Broadnax, Michigan (AP-2)
 Ron Saul, Ohio State (AP-2)
 Angelo Loukas, Northwestern (UPI-2)

Centers
 Jack Rudnay, Northwestern (AP-1; UPI-1)
 Mike Frame, Northwestern (AP-2; UPI-2)

Defensive selections

Ends
 Phil Seymour, Michigan (AP-1; UPI-1)
 Bob Stein, Minnesota (AP-1; UPI-1)
 Dave Whitfield, Ohio State (AP-2; UPI-2)
 Tom Bilunas, Indiana (AP-2)
 Bill McCoy, Purdue (UPI-2)

Tackles
 Charles Bailey, Michigan State (AP-1)
 Tom Goss, Michigan (AP-1)
 Bill Yanchar, Purdue (UPI-1)
 Paul Schmidlin, Ohio State (AP-2; UPI-2)
 Henry Hill, Michigan (AP-2)
 Ron Kamzelski, Minnesota (UPI-2)

Middle guard
 Chuck Kyle, Purdue (AP-1; UPI-1 [tackle])
 Jim Stillwagon, Ohio State (UPI-2)

Linebackers
 Ken Criter, Wisconsin (AP-1; UPI-1)
 Jack Tatum, Ohio State (AP-1; UPI-1)
 Noel Jenke, Minnesota (AP-1; UPI-2)
 Tom Stincic, Michigan (UPI-1)
 Rich Saul, Michigan State (AP-2 [middle guard]; UPI-2)
 Mark Stier, Ohio State (AP-2; UPI-2)
 Jim Sniadecki, Indiana (AP-2)
 Bob Yunaska, Purdue (AP-2)

Defensive backs
 Al Brenner, Michigan State (AP-1; UPI-1; UPI-2 [offensive end])
 Tom Curtis, Michigan (AP-1; UPI-1)
 Ted Provost, Ohio State (AP-1; UPI-2)
 Nate Cunningham, Indiana (UPI-1)
 Dennis White, Northwestern (AP-2; UPI-2)
 Doug Roalstad, Minnesota (AP-2)
 Steve Wilson, Iowa (AP-2)
 Mike Sensibaugh, Ohio State (UPI-2)

Key
AP = Associated Press (AP), selected by a "board of sportswriters covering the Big Ten scene"

UPI = United Press International (UPI), selected by the league's coaches

Bold = Consensus first-team selection of both the AP and UPI

See also
1968 College Football All-America Team

References

All-Big Ten Conference
All-Big Ten Conference football teams